The 110th Pennsylvania House of Representatives District is located in Bradford County and Wyoming County and includes the following areas:

 Bradford County
 Albany Township
 Asylum Township
 Athens
 Athens Township
 Herrick Township
 Le Raysville
 Litchfield Township
 New Albany
 Orwell Township
 Pike Township
 Rome
 Rome Township
 Sayre
 Sheshequin Township
 South Waverly
 Standing Stone Township
 Stevens Township
 Terry Township
 Towanda
 Tuscarora Township
 Ulster Township
 Warren Township
 Wilmot Township
 Windham Township
 Wyalusing
 Wyalusing Township
 Wysox Township
 All of Wyoming County

Representatives

References

Government of Bradford County, Pennsylvania
Government of Sullivan County, Pennsylvania
Government of Susquehanna County, Pennsylvania
110